Suillia oceana, is a European species of Heleomyzidae.

References

Heleomyzidae
Diptera of Europe
Insects described in 1908
Taxa named by Theodor Becker